Je chante avec toi Liberté (1981)  also known in English as Song for Liberty (1970)  is a song written by Pierre Delanoë and Claude Lemesle, arranged by Alain Goraguer and performed by Nana Mouskouri. The melody is from "Va, pensiero" (Italian: [va penˈsjɛro]) also known in English as the "Chorus of the Hebrew Slaves" from the opera Nabucco (1842) by Giuseppe Verdi.

Nana Mouskouri has performed this song in at least five languages; French: Je chante avec toi liberté, English: Song for Liberty, German: Lied der Freiheit, Spanish: Libertad and Portuguese: Liberdade.

References

Nana Mouskouri songs
1970 songs
Songs written by Pierre Delanoë
Songs about freedom